Mark Bernard (born February 1, 1969) is a Canadian former professional ice hockey goaltender and coach.

Bernard is the current General Manager of the American Hockey League's Rockford IceHogs, a position he has held since the 2010–11 AHL season.

References

External links

1969 births
Baltimore Skipjacks players
Basingstoke Bison players
Bracknell Bees players
Buffalo Wings (inline hockey) players
Erie Panthers players
Fayetteville Force players
Hamilton Steelhawks players
Hampton Roads Admirals players
Ice hockey people from Ontario
Johnstown Chiefs players
Living people
Manchester Storm (1995–2002) players
Philadelphia Bulldogs players
Rochester Americans players
San Antonio Iguanas players
Sportspeople from Hamilton, Ontario
Toledo Storm players
Canadian ice hockey goaltenders